The Taiwanese brown-toothed shrew (Episoriculus fumidus) is a species of shrew in the tribe Nectogalini. It is found only in Taiwan. It prefers dense ground cover in forests and subalpine shrublands in high mountains of central Taiwan.

See also
 List of protected species in Taiwan
 List of endemic species of Taiwan

References

Red-toothed shrews
Mammals of Taiwan
Endemic fauna of Taiwan
Mammals described in 1913